I Don't Want To Go To School is the second soundtrack album by The Naked Brothers Band, it was the soundtrack for the second season of The Naked Brothers Band. The album was released as a deluxe fanpack that includes a poster, lyrics and two bonus tracks.

Background

Development
When the band's mockumentary television series was commissioned for a second season, the boys' mother Polly Draper asked her sons to record a new album. Initially, the siblings started to write new songs in 2007. Nat Wolff wrote the title's hit track, "I Don't Want to Go to School", after pestering his parents to stay home from school, because if he did he would write a song. Subsequently, Nat wrote the song and then he was sent to school anyway.

Recording
The band began recording their new album in mid-2007. The songs were recorded for the second season of The Naked Brothers Band television series. Recording took as short as three months, which ended in October 2007.

Release
The album was slated for an April 2008 release, just five months after their debut album, "The Naked Brothers Band". Nat and Alex released two versions, the normal album and a fan pack edition, including two bonus tracks, a poster with lyrics and a DVD with behind the scenes. It ranked #23 on the top 200 Billboard charts.

Singles
The album released one single, the title track, "I Don't Want to Go to School". The single was released on April 3, 2008
along with a music video, which features various clips from Season 2.

Track listings

Personnel
 Backing Vocals – Angela Clemmons, Dana Calitri, Debi Derryberry, Janice Pendarvis, Nedra Neal*, Russel Velazquez*, Tawatha Agee*, Vaneese Thomas
 Bass – Bob Glaub
 Cello – Erik Friedlander
 Drums – Matt Laug
 Drums, Percussion – Mike Baird
 Drums, Vocals – Alex Wolff
 Edited By [Digital] – Roger Lian
 Engineer – Tom McCauley
 Guitar – Craig Stull, Mike Butler, Thor Laewe*
 Guitar [Pedal Steel] – Joshua Grange
 Guitar, Piano, Vocals, Backing Vocals – Nat Wolff
 Mastered By – Howie Weinberg
 Percussion – M.B. Gordy
 Producer [Additional Production] – Daniel Wise
 Producer, Accordion, Arranged By, Keyboards – Michael Wolff
 Producer, Arranged By, Strings, Keyboards – Michael Levine
 Saxophone [Alto And Tenor] – Lou Marini
 Trombone – Larry Farrell
 Trumpet – Alan Rubin, Lew Soloff

Reviews

Allmusic gave the album 3½ stars, calling it a great effort after the band's debut soundtrack The Naked Brothers Band, which was released in October 2007. The titular song was covered by Casey and His Brother on the Uncle Muscles Hour variety show in 2009.

References

External links
 Visit Website!
 Watch Episodes!

2008 soundtrack albums
Television soundtracks
Columbia Records soundtracks
Pop rock soundtracks